Mikros Image is a French company specializing in the creation of digital visual effects, post-production and animation.

With studios in Paris, London, Brussels, Liege, and Montreal, the company was acquired by Technicolor SA in 2015.

Portfolio

Mikros Image Montreal and Mikros Animation
 Go West! A Lucky Luke Adventure (2007) (post-production)
 Logorama (2009)
 Oggy and the Cockroaches: The Movie (2013) (post-production)
 Mune: Guardian of the Moon (2014)
 The Little Prince (2015)
 Sahara (2017)
 Captain Underpants: The First Epic Movie (2017)  
 Stronger (2017; VFX)
 The Big Bad Fox and Other Tales... (2017; VFX)
 Sgt. Stubby: An American Hero (2018)
 The SpongeBob Movie: Sponge on the Run (2020)
 PAW Patrol: The Movie (2021)
 Teenage Mutant Ninja Turtles: Mutant Mayhem (2023)
 PAW Patrol: The Mighty Movie (2023)
 Thelma the Unicorn (TBA)

Mikros Image Europe
The Ninth Gate (1999; VFX)
The Crimson Rivers (2000; VFX)
Oceans (2009; VFX)
Immortals (2011; VFX)
Wolfy, The Incredible Secret (2013, post-production)
Asterix: The Mansions of the Gods (2014)
Valerian and the City of a Thousand Planets (2017; VFX)
 Sherlock Gnomes (2018)
 Asterix: The Secret of the Magic Potion (2018)
 Ozi (2022)
 Teenage Mutant Ninja Turtles: Mutant Mayhem (2023)
 The Tiger's Apprentice (2024)

References

External links 
 Mikros Image Canada at the Internet Movie Database
 Mikros Image France at the Internet Movie Database
 Official website

Visual effects companies
French animation studios
2015 mergers and acquisitions
Technicolor Creative Studios